Grand Cane United Methodist Church is a frame Gothic Revival historic church located at 8446 US 171 in Grand Cane, Louisiana. Built in 1888, the church had a three-story tower with an octagonal spire. The tower was modified in 1959, brought to single story and the spire replaced by a pitched roof. In 1990–91, in an effort to restore the original appearance, the tower was replaced with a copy of the previous one, based on photographs.

The church was added to the National Register of Historic Places in 1992.

See also
National Register of Historic Places listings in DeSoto Parish, Louisiana

References

United Methodist churches in Louisiana
Churches on the National Register of Historic Places in Louisiana
Gothic Revival church buildings in Louisiana
Churches completed in 1888
Churches in DeSoto Parish, Louisiana
National Register of Historic Places in DeSoto Parish, Louisiana